The New Continent is an album by trumpeter Dizzy Gillespie's Big Band featuring performances arranged and composed by Lalo Schifrin and conducted by Benny Carter recorded in 1962 and released on the Limelight label. The CD reissue added four bonus tracks originally released on An Electrifying Evening with the Dizzy Gillespie Quintet (Verve, 1961).

Track listing
All compositions by Lalo Schifrin except as indicated
 "The Empire" - 5:48 
 "The Conquerors" - 7:32 
 "The Legend of Atlantis" - 7:43 
 "The Chains" - 9:10 
 "The Swords" - 4:06 
 "Chorale" - 5:48 
 "Kush" (Dizzy Gillespie) – 11:01 Bonus track on CD reissue
 "Salt Peanuts" (Kenny Clarke, Gillespie) – 7:08 Bonus track on CD reissue
 "A Night in Tunisia" (Gillespie, Frank Paparelli) – 6:46 Bonus track on CD reissue
 "The Mooche" (Duke Ellington, Irving Mills) – 11:43 Bonus track on CD reissue
Recorded at United Recording Studios in Los Angeles, California in September, 1962 (tracks 1-6) and at The Museum Of Modern Art in New York City on February 9, 1961 (tracks 7-10)

Personnel
 Dizzy Gillespie - trumpet
 Conte Candoli, Al Porcino, Ray Triscari, Stu Williamson - trumpet (tracks 1-6)
 Mike Barone, Bob Edmonson, Frank Rosolino, Kenny Shroyer - trombone (tracks 1-6)
 Luis Kant, Stewart Rensey, Ches Thompson - French horn (tracks 1-6)
 Red Callender - tuba (tracks 1-6)
 Charlie Kennedy, Phil Woods - alto saxophone (tracks 1-6)
 Leo Wright - alto saxophone, flute (tracks 7-10)
 James Moody, Bill Perkins - tenor saxophone (tracks 1-6)
 Bill Hood - baritone saxophone (tracks 1-6)
 Lalo Schifrin - piano, arranger
 Al Hendrickson - guitar (tracks 1-6)
 Buddy Clark (tracks 1-6), Bob Cunningham (tracks 7-10), Chris White (tracks 1-6) - double bass
 Rudy Collins (tracks 1-6), Chuck Lampkin (tracks 7-10), Mel Lewis (tracks 1-6) - drums 
 Candido Camero - conga (tracks 7-10)
 Francisco Aguabella, Larry Bunker, Emil Richards - percussion (tracks 1-6)
 Benny Carter - conductor (tracks 1-6)

References 

Dizzy Gillespie albums
1962 albums
Limelight Records albums
Albums arranged by Lalo Schifrin